The railroad linking Dakar (Senegal) to Saint-Louis was the first railroad line in French West Africa when it opened in 1885. It is no longer in service.

References

Further reading
.

Metre gauge railways in Senegal